Helgeland is a Norwegian surname. Notable people with the surname include:

Asbjørn Helgeland (born 1966), Norwegian footballer and manager
Brian Helgeland (born 1961), American screenwriter, film producer and director
Sjur Helgeland (1858–1924), Norwegian musician and composer

Norwegian-language surnames